Events from the year 1276 in Ireland.

Incumbent
Lord: Edward I

Events

Hereditary lordship of all Thomond is granted to Thomas de Clare.

Births

Deaths

References

 
1270s in Ireland
Ireland
Years of the 13th century in Ireland